Helen Rosner is an American food writer and editor. She is food correspondent for The New Yorker.

From 2014 to 2017, Rosner was an editor at Eater, serving as long-form features editor and later executive editor. She joined Eater after spending four years as executive digital editor at Saveur. Prior to that, she was online restaurant editor for New York Magazine and an assistant cookbook editor at Workman. With Raphael Brion, she co-founded the food blog Eat Me Daily, which "carved out a vital place in a crowded food blog world by being smarter, wittier, and faster than everyone else," according to Rosner's colleague, Eater co-founder Lockhart Steele. Rosner and Brion initially wrote the blog under pseudonyms. Rosner's essay "On Chicken Tenders," published in Guernica, won the 2016 James Beard Foundation Journalism award for Personal Essay.

When she tweeted about a roast chicken recipe using a hair dryer to dry the chicken before cooking, this drew many responses, including criticism that she responded to with details about the technique.

In 2018, Rosner was nominated for the James Beard Foundation M.F.K. Fisher Distinguished Writing Award for her piece, "Christ in the Garden of Endless Breadsticks."

References

External links 

 Official website

Year of birth missing (living people)
Living people
American food writers
American editors
Smith College alumni
James Beard Foundation Award winners
Women food writers
American women editors
21st-century American photographers
21st-century American non-fiction writers
21st-century American women writers
American women non-fiction writers
Writers from Chicago
Photographers from Illinois
Artists from Chicago
New York (magazine) people
The New Yorker staff writers
21st-century American women photographers